The Wennington wildfire was a wildfire that took place in Wennington, east London, on 19 July 2022 during the 2022 United Kingdom heatwave. No-one was killed, but the wildfire destroyed about 18–19 houses, including all the possessions of many residents. One resident said her house burned down "within two minutes".

The wildfire began when a compost heap spontaneously combusted. It took place on the hottest day since British records began, and has been described as an indication of the threat posed by global warming in the UK, a country in which wildfires have historically been rare and mostly seen on isolated grassland and moorland areas rather than in urban areas.

Background

Wennington is a village in the east of London, on the edge of the built up area. The area is surrounded by grassland.

Wildfires are a known risk in the UK, however, they are most associated with isolated moorland and heathland areas, rather than built-up areas.

The fire occurred during the 2022 United Kingdom heat waves, and 19 July was predicted by forecasters in advance to be extremely hot. A long period of little rain before 19 July had also left vegetation very dry.

Although one of the most destructive fires of 19 July, many other fires were reported on the same day. The Mayor of London reported that the number of fire brigade emergency calls was seven times the normal.

Events
The fire reportedly started around 1 p.m. from a compost heap in the southeast of the village which spontaneously combusted, with flames spreading along a garden fence. Although a fire station is located in the east of the village, the crews had been called out to other fires. The fire brigade was called at 13:06, and a fire engine arrived seven minutes later, by which time the fire had expanded. One firefighter told LBC News that "it felt apocalyptic, just crazy, we were chasing it and we had no chance of stopping it".

Residents took shelter in the nearby St Mary and St Peter's Church. The church filled with smoke while they were sheltering and the fire burned through the graveyard around the building, but the church itself was not damaged.

Parish churchwarden Tim Stock said that his family had "lost everything" but had managed to evacuate his family and pets. Claire Taylor said that her house burned down "within two minutes" and that she lost almost all her family's possessions. One resident said that grass fires in the area were quite common "but it's nothing like this...this is like the apocalypse." Stock commented that "it was like a warzone...all the windows had exploded out, all the rooves had caved, it was like a scene from the Blitz".

Aftermath

Andy Roe, head of the London Fire Brigade, described the events as "unprecedented": "I saw stuff this week that I had not expected to see as a London firefighter." 

Experts commented that climate change was increasing fire risk. Guillermo Rein, Professor of Fire Sciences at Imperial College London, said that "the UK will start to see fires which are much larger". Dr Rory Hadden, Senior Lecturer in Fire Investigation at the University of Edinburgh, commented that "as the climate changes, the UK will be susceptible to these kinds of fires which can be extremely devastating...we should expect more and larger wildfires". Nigel Arnell, professor of climate system science at the University of Reading, commented that "while we might not see the sorts of forest fires sweeping through Spain, Portugal and France, we are increasingly prone to fires in grassland and moorland that have the potential to affect people, property and infrastructure as well as the environment...climate change is increasing fire danger across the UK, and we need to be prepared for it." Graham Beers, Station Commander of Wennington Fire Station, who had been attending another fire when the fire started, commented "These sorts of fires are not going to be the last...That's just due to climate change. Twenty years in the fire service and I've never really seen devastation like it." Paul Davies, chief meteorologist at the Met Office, commented that the heatwave would have been "impossible in the pre-industrial era". LFB Assistant Commissioner Jonathan Smith commented "we are increasingly being challenged by new extremes of weather as our climate changes and we're developing long-term strategies to deal with more incidents like this in the future."

Another grass fire began burning in the area three days later, and another in August.

See also
 2022 European and Mediterranean wildfires

References

External links
 London Fire Brigade report
 Drone footage, 19 July

2022 fires in the United Kingdom
2022 in London
2022 wildfires
Fires in London
History of the London Borough of Havering
July 2022 events in the United Kingdom
Wildfires in the United Kingdom